Blastobasis egens is a moth in the  family Blastobasidae. It is found in South Africa and the Democratic Republic of the Congo.

The length of the forewings is 4.5–4.9 mm. The forewings are white intermixed with brown scales along the costa and distal half. The hindwings are pale brown.

References

Moths described in 1918
Blastobasis
Moths of Africa